Malatesta IV (or III) Malatesta (also known as Malatesta dei Sonetti; 1370 - 19 December 1429) was an Italian condottiero, poet and lord of Pesaro, Fossombrone, Gradara, Jesi, Narni and other fiefs in Italy.

Biography
Born in Pesaro, he was the only son of Pandolfo II Malatesta and his second wife Paola Orsini. He was given the nickname "dei sonetti" ("of the Sonnets") due to his love for literature and fine arts. He married Elisabetta da Varano, who gave him seven children : Galeazzo, Carlo, Galeotto, Paola, Pandolfo, Cleofa and Taddea.

He became lord of Pesaro in 1385. He was hired by pope Urban VI to fight against antipope Clement VII. In 1390 he fought against the Bolognesi led by Giovanni da Barbiano and later was hired by Republic of Florence against  the Visconti of Milan. In 1392 he was excommunicated by the pope for having conquered Todi, namely a Papal possession.

He 1394 he served antipope Benedict XIII, who named him captain general of Bologna, to fight against pope Boniface VIII. During the conflict, he destroyed several towns in Umbria and the Latium, and took control Narni and Orte for himself as podestà. Later he made peace with Boniface. In 1404 Malatesta was hired by the Republic of Venice, which assigned him some 20,000 troops to fight against the Carraresi of Padua. However, the Venetian troops were defeated and returned to Pesaro in the late 1404, after which he made a pilgrimage to Santiago de Compostela.

Once freed, he sided for antipope Alexander V who, in 1409, ordered him to fight in Tuscany along the Florentines against the forces of Ladislaus of Naples. The conflict lasted until 1412: Malatesta again made peace with the pope, and thenceforth warred against antipope John XXIII. In 1415 he defended his Umbrian fiefs from Braccio da Montone. In 1416-1417 Malatesta was involved in the war for Jesi, which depleted his treasure.

In 1423 he was hired by Florence in the war against Milan. In 1424, in the battle of Zagonara, his cousin Carlo was taken prisoner; the same fate struck  his sons Galeazzo and Carlo after they were besieged in Gradara by Angelo della Pergola. The following year Malatesta signed a treaty of peace at Abbiategrasso.

Malatesta was also the author of poems, collected in a Canzoniere, influenced by Petrarch and the contemporary Tuscan literature.

Sources

External links
Page at Dizionario Biografico degli Italia 

1370 births
1429 deaths
Malatesta 4
15th-century condottieri
People temporarily excommunicated by the Catholic Church
Italian poets
Italian male poets
Lords of Pesaro
15th-century Italian poets
14th-century condottieri
Republic of Venice generals